Syntomidopsis gundlachiana is a moth in the subfamily Arctiinae. It was described by Berthold Neumoegen in 1890. It is found on Cuba.

References

Moths described in 1890
Arctiinae
Endemic fauna of Cuba